Luisina Brando (born Luisa Noemí Gnazzo; December 10, 1945 in Buenos Aires, Argentina) is an Argentine actress.

Filmography
1960: Telecómicos (TV Series, 3 episodes)
1961: Los trabajos de Marrone (TV Series)
1961: Viendo a Biondi (TV Series, 3 episodes)
1964: Teatro Trece (TV Series, 1 episode)
1964: El gordo Villanueva
1965: Llegan parientes de España (TV Movie)
1968: Estrellita, esa pobre campesina (TV Series, 29 episodes)
1969: El bulín
1970: Uno entre nosotros (TV Series, 19 episodes)
1970: Una vida para amarte (TV Series, 29 episodes)
1970: Otra vez Drácula (TV Mini Series, 5 episodes
1970: Historias para no creer (TV Series, 1 episode)
1971: Los vecinos son macanudos (TV Series, 19 episodes)
1971: La supernoche (TV Series, 1 episode)
1971: Juguemos al amor (TV Series, 19 episodes)
1971: Frente a la facultad (TV Series, 19 episodes)
1971: Dejame que te cuente (TV Series, 19 episodes)
1971: Así amaban los héroes (TV Series, 19 episodes)
1971: Puntos suspensivos o Esperando a los bárbaros
1971: Alta comedia: El avaro (TV Movie)
1972: María y Eloísa (TV Series, 9 episodes)
1972: La novela semanal (TV Series, 1 episode)
1972: La novela mensual (TV Series, 3 episodes)
1972: La bocina (TV Series)
1972: El alma encantada (TV Movie)
1973: Mi dulce enamorada (TV Series)
1972-1973: Malevo (TV Series, 329 episodes)
1973: La chispa del amor (TV Series, 3 episodes)
1973: El Teatro de Norma Aleandro (TV Series, 1 episode)
1973: Paño verde
1973: Proceso a una mujer libre (TV Movie)
1973: Miedo a quererte (TV Movie)
1974: Todos nosotros (TV Series, 19 episodes)
1973-1974: Humor a la italiana (TV Series, 6 episodes)
1974: Boquitas pintadas
1975: Juan del Sur (TV Series, 19 episodes)
1975: The Jewish Gauchos
1976: Juan que reía
1976: Free for All
1976: Nosotros (TV Series)
1977: Mi hermano Javier (TV Series, 29 episodes)
1977: Aventura '77 (TV Mini Series, 19 episodes)
1978: The Lion's Share
1979: Fortín quieto (TV Mini Series, 1 episode)
1979: Contragolpe
1979: The Island
1980: Somos como somos o no somos? (TV Series, 19 episodes)
1980: Dear Friends
1980: Días de ilusión
1981: Mi viejo y yo (TV Series, 19 episodes)
1981: Sentimental
1982: Los especiales de ATC (TV Series, 1 episode)
1982: Juan sin nombre (TV Series, 39 episodes)
1968-1982: El mundo del espectáculo (TV Series, 2 episodes)
1982: Nobody's Wife
1983: Los días contados (TV Series, 19 episodes)
1983: La estrella del norte (TV Series, 19 episodes)
1984: Los gringos (TV Mini Series), 19 episodes)
1984: La señora Ordóñez (TV Series, 92 episodes)
1984: Nights Without Moons and Suns
1984: State of Reality
1985: Cuentos para ver (TV Series, 1 episode)
1985: La búsqueda
1985: There's Some Guys Downstairs
1985: Bairoletto, la aventura de un rebelde
1986: Miss Mary
1986: Muchacho de luna (TV Movie)
1987: El hombre de la deuda externa
1987: El año del conejo
1991: Alta comedia (TV Series, 1 episode)
1990-1991: Atreverse (TV Series, 10 episodes)
1992: Amores (TV Series, 5 episodes)
1992: Where Are You My Love, That I Cannot Find You?
1993: I Don't Want to Talk About It
1970-1994: Alta comedia (TV Series, 12 episodes)
1995: Go On, Carlos, Strike Again
1996: No todo es noticia (TV Series 1996, 3 episodes)
1996: The Salt in the Wound
1997-1998: De corazón (TV Series, 396 episodes)
1998: Como vos & yo (TV Series, 378 episodes)
2000: Forbidden Love (TV Series 200 episodes)
2001: Los médicos (de hoy) 2 (TV Series)
2002: Chela Fernández (65 episodes)
2002: Husband to Go (TV Series, 39 episodes)
2003: Gipsy Love (TV Series, 251 episodes)
2005: Amor en custodia (TV Series, 2 episodes)
2005: Amor en custodia (TV Series)
2006: Amas de casa desesperadas (TV Mini Series 
2006: Felisa Gutièrrez (18 episodes
2007: Los cuentos de Fontanarrosa (TV Mini Series, 1 episode)
2009: Herencia de amor (TV Series, 272 episodes)
2011: Víndica (TV Mini Series, 1 episode)
2012: No te enamores de mí
2014: Doce casas (TV Mini Series, 2 episodes

Television
2003-2004 Soy gitano (Amparo)

References

External links

1945 births
Actresses from Buenos Aires
Living people
20th-century Argentine actresses
21st-century Argentine actresses
Argentine film actresses